Savage Skies, a video game created by iRock Interactive, is a combat flight simulator set in a fictional world.

Gameplay
The player can choose between three factions of mythical creatures.  The three factions were created when the King of the Land fell to the necromancer Mortalvis, and the land was divided into three. The first two were owned by subjects of the late king, whilst Mortalvis took the last third.

Once all the monsters are unlocked, they can be used on any campaign level and any multiplayer level. There are additional items that can be unlocked, including cheats, such as vampirism, and in-game movie sequences.

Critical reception
Gamezone rated Savage Skies at 6.5 out of 10, finding the game concept to be fun with good variation in play style between the three factions. Criticisms included the average graphics, bad sound, and several missions with excessive difficulty.

Ozzy Osbourne endorsement

At an earlier stage in its development, Savage Skies had been set for release as Ozzy’s Black Skies, complete with an endorsement from Black Sabbath front man Ozzy Osbourne. In the original concept, each of the game's three playable factions would have been led by a different ‘Ozzy character’. The game was also to feature music from Osbourne, including "Crazy Train" and "Paranoid," as well as a track recorded specifically for iRock (the song was called "Black Skies").

However, in late 2001, the tie-in was dropped for reasons including its high financial cost and "misconceptions about the game that made it difficult to secure a publisher." Its name was subsequently changed to Savage Skies.

Xbox version 

An Xbox version of the game was planned but cancelled.

References

External links
https://archive.today/20120716233724/http://uk.gamespot.com/pc/action/savageskies/news.html?sid=2762119&mode=previews
http://uk.gamespot.com/pc/action/savageskies/news.html?sid=2830726&om_act=convert&om_clk=newsfeatures&tag=newsfeatures;title;1
http://www.metacritic.com/games/platforms/ps2/savageskies?q=Savage%20Skies

2002 video games
Combat flight simulators
PlayStation 2 games
Video games developed in the United States
Windows games
Xbox games